Pandit S. N. Shukla University is an institution of higher education located in Shahdol, Madhya Pradesh, India. It is a State university founded in 2016 by Government of Madhya Pradesh. It is affiliated under University Grants Commission (UGC).

History 
Established in 1956, Govt. Pandit Shambhunath Shukla College, Shahdol was affiliated To Awadesh Pratap Singh University, Rewa till 2016. After that it has been made a university. It is named after Indian independence activist and former chief minister of Vindhya Pradesh Shri S.N. Shukla.

Campus 
Currently, the campus is located in the city spread across 26 acres with a sports facility, boy's hostel, well-equipped laboratories, libraries and a complete WIFI coverage. The new 50 acres university campus building has been inaugurated by the Governor of Madhya Pradesh at Village Nawalpur in Shahdol district

Location
The current campus of 26 acres is situated nearby Kotwali Thana, Shahdol and it is about 2.7 km and 2.5 km from New Bus Stand, Shahdol and Railway Station, Shahdol respectively.

The New 50 acres University Campus Building is situated nearby Nawalpur Village about 11 km and 12 km from New Bus Stand, Shahdol and Railway Station, Shahdol respectively.

Academic 

The university is structured into the following academic divisions:

 Physics
 Mathematics
 Bio-Technology
 Computer Science
 Botany
 Chemistry
 Bio-Chemistry
 Biology
 Geology
 English
 Hindi
 Zoology

References 

State universities in India
2016 establishments in Madhya Pradesh
Universities in Madhya Pradesh
Educational institutions established in 2016
Shahdol